Alice Coote  OBE (born 10 May 1968) is a British lyric mezzo-soprano.

Life
Coote was born in Frodsham, Cheshire, the daughter of the painter Mark Coote. She was educated at the Guildhall School of Music and Drama in London (though she did not complete her course), the Royal Northern College of Music in Manchester (where she came into contact with Janet Baker and Brigitte Fassbaender) and the National Opera Studio during 1995/96. Coote was a BBC Radio 3 New Generation Artist from 2001 until 2003. She sings both operatic roles, particularly trouser roles, and recital repertoire, often with pianist Julius Drake.

An interpreter of Handel she has also performed contemporary pieces such as Dominick Argento's From the Diary of Virginia Woolf, a partly atonal work first performed by Janet Baker, who influenced Coote. Judith Weir has written a song cycle, The Voice of Desire, especially for her; it was premiered at a BBC Chamber Prom.

Coote has performed at England's Opera North, the English National Opera, the Metropolitan Opera in New York (Hansel in Humperdinck's Hansel and Gretel), the San Francisco Opera in 2002 (Ruggiero in Handel's Alcina) and 2008 (Idamante in Mozart's Idomeneo). In 2009, she appeared as Maffio Orsini in Donizetti's Lucrezia Borgia at the Bavarian State Opera. She also performed in 2011 as Prince Charming in Massenet's Cendrillon at the Royal Opera House. In 2013, she played Sextus in the Metropolitan Opera's production of Handel's Giulio Cesare. In March 2017 she reprised the role of Idamante in six performances at the Metropolitan Opera.

Recordings 
 2002: The Choice of Hercules (Handel) – Susan Gritton, Alice Coote, Robin Blaze; The King's Consort – Robert King; Hyperion CDA67298
 2003: Lieder – (Mahler, Haydn, Schumann) – Alice Coote, Julius Drake (piano); EMI Classics 7243 5 85559 2 9
 2010: Symphony No. 2 Resurrection (Mahler) – Alice Coote, Natalie Dessay; Frankfurt Radio Symphony Orchestra and Orfeón Donostiarra – Paavo Järvi; Virgin Classics 50999 694586 0 6
 2013: Das Lied von der Erde (Mahler) – Alice Coote, Burkhard Fritz (tenor); Netherlands Philharmonic Orchestra – Marc Albrecht; Pentatone PTC 5186502
 2014: Handel Arias – Alice Coote; The English Concert – Harry Bicket; Hyperion
 2014: Die Winterreise (Schubert) – Alice Coote, Julius Drake (piano); Harmonia Mundi
 2015: L'heure exquise – A French Songbook (Poulenc, Hahn, Gounod, Chausson) – Alice Coote, Graham Johnson (piano); Hyperion
 2016: Sea Pictures (Elgar) – Alice Coote; Hallé Orchestra – Mark Elder; Naxos
 2016: Schumann Lieder (incl. Frauenliebe und -leben, Dichterliebe) – Alice Coote, Christian Blackshaw (piano); Harmonia Mundi
 2017: Mahler Song Cycles (Mahler) – Marc Albrecht, Alice Coote, Netherlands Philharmonic Orchestra; PENTATONE PTC 5186576

References

External links
 
 Profile at IMG Artists
 Albums, Discogs

1968 births
Living people
Alumni of the Guildhall School of Music and Drama
Alumni of the Royal Northern College of Music
British performers of early music
Women performers of early music
English mezzo-sopranos
20th-century British women opera singers
Singers from Cheshire
Operatic mezzo-sopranos
People from Frodsham
BBC Radio 3 New Generation Artists
21st-century British women opera singers